Lorimer is a surname of Scottish origin which means "a bridle maker." It may also refer to a "maker and seller of spurs, bits, and other metal attachments to harness and tackle" and derives from Anglo-Norman French lorenier, loremier, an agent derivative of Old French lorain meaning ‘tackle’ or  ‘harness’, etc.

Notable people with the surname include:
 Bob Lorimer (born 1953), retired Canadian ice hockey defenceman
 David Lockhart Robertson Lorimer (1876–1962), officer in the British Indian Army and noted linguist
 George Lorimer (disambiguation)
 Glennis Lorimer (1913–1968), British actress
 Henry Lorimer (1879–1933), British Conservative Party politician
 Hew Lorimer (1907–1993), Scottish sculptor
 Hugh Lorimer (born 1896), Scottish footballer
 Ian Lorimer, British television director
 James Lorimer (1926-2022), American attorney and FBI agent
 James Lorimer (Australian politician) (1831–1889), Australian politician and businessman
 James Lorimer (South African politician)
 John Gordon Lorimer (civil servant) (1870–1914), Scottish colonial administrator and historian
 John Henry Lorimer (1856–1936), Scottish painter who worked on portraits and genre scenes of everyday life
 John Lorimer (doctor) (1732–1795), Anglo-American surgeon, mathematician, politician and cartographer
 Linda Lorimer, American university administrator
 Maxwell George Lorimer, known as Max Wall (1908–1990), English comedian and actor
 Norma Lorimer (1864–1948),  Scots novelist and travel writer
 Peter Lorimer (1946–2021), footballer of the 1960s, '70s, and '80s for Leeds United
 Robert Lorimer (1864–1929), Scottish architect
 Roddy Lorimer (born 1953), Scottish musician who has performed with Blur, Gene, The Rolling Stones, Suede, The Waterboys and Kick Horns
 William Lorimer (politician) (1861–1934), United States Senator and congressman from the State of Illinois
 William Lorimer (scholar) (1885–1967), scholar best known for his translation of the New Testament into Lowland Scots

References

Surnames of Scottish origin
Scottish surnames
Surnames of British Isles origin
Occupational surnames
English-language occupational surnames